Pilot is a single-user, multitasking operating system designed by Xerox PARC in early 1977. Pilot was written in the Mesa programming language, totalling about 24,000 lines of code.

Overview 
Pilot was designed as a single user system in a highly networked environment of other Pilot systems, with interfaces designed for inter-process communication (IPC) across the network via the Pilot stream interface. Pilot combined virtual memory and file storage into one subsystem, and used the manager/kernel architecture for managing the system and its resources.   

Its designers considered a non-preemptive multitasking model, but later chose a preemptive (run until blocked) system based on monitors.  Pilot included a debugger, Co-Pilot, that could debug a frozen snapshot of the operating system, written to disk.  

A typical Pilot workstation ran 3 operating systems at once on 3 different disk volumes : Co-Co-Pilot (a backup debugger in case the main operating system crashed), Co-Pilot (the main operating system, running under co-pilot and used to compile and bind programs) and an inferior copy of Pilot running in a 3rd disk volume, that could be booted to run test programs (that might crash the main development environment).  

The debugger was written to read and write variables for a program stored on a separate disk volume.

This architecture was unique because it allowed the developer to single-step even operating system code with semaphore locks, stored on an inferior disk volume.  However, as the memory and source code of the D-series Xerox processors grew, the time to checkpoint and restore the operating system (known as a "world swap") grew very high.  It could take 60-120 seconds to run just one line of code in the inferior operating system environment.  

Eventually, a co-resident debugger was developed to take the place of Co-Pilot.

Pilot was used as the operating system for the Xerox Star workstation.

See also
Timeline of operating systems

References

Further reading
Horsley, T.R., and Lynch, W.C. Pilot: A software engineering case history. In Proc. 4th Int. Conf. Software Engineering, Munich, Germany, Sept. 1979, pp. 94-99.

External links 
 Pilot: An Operating System for a Personal Computer

Computer-related introductions in 1981
History of human–computer interaction
Proprietary operating systems
Window-based operating systems
Pilot
1981 software